Jungpana Tea Estate, one of the most celebrated tea estates of Darjeeling, is a tea garden in the Kurseong CD block in the Kurseong subdivision of the Darjeeling district in the Indian state of West Bengal.

History
Jungpana Tea Estate was started by an intrepid British planter Mr. Henry Montgomery Lennox, in 1899, who planted the first tea saplings. He was succeeded by another British planter Mr. G.W.O’ Brein who set up the TEA FACTORY and for many formative years, guided Jungpana’s growth. After World War-II, Mr. O’Brien sold the tea estate to the ruling Rana family of Nepal King Tribhuwan Bir Bikram Shah.  

Mayfair Group, a leading hospitality group of Eastern India, recently acquired the Tea Estate. Mayfair with its meticulous design & aesthetics, inspires to raise the standard not only in producing quality tea, but also in tea tourism segment.

Etymology 
The area took its name after a valiant Gorkha Jung Bahadur, who was mauled by a leopard, while trying to save his British master. As he was dying, he asked his master for some “pana”, or water. He was taken to a nearby spring and given water, but died soon after. The area came to be called Jungpana, a combination of the man’s first name and his hoarse cry for water.

Geography

Jungpana Tea Estate is spread over 400 acres (62 ha),[1] at an altitude ranging from 1,000 to 1,500 metres (3,300 to 6,500 ft), surrounded by pine forests on the upper reaches to the north and swiftly gurgling mountain streams to the south, east and west, skirted by dense vegetation and about 7 waterfalls,  the Tea Estate is  almost impregnable- cacooned by Nature for safe keeping. No wonder then that the Estate is endearingly referred to as “an Island in the Mountains”. 

The tea estates in the surrounding areas are: Goomtee Tea Estate, Sivitar Tea Estate and Mahaldiram Tea Estate.

Jungpana the iconic tea garden christened as queen of Darjeeling is about 40 Kms from the Bagdogra Airport and takes around one and half hour by road and an hour from MAYFAIR Tea Resort. The scenic drive takes you to MAHANADI RAILWAY STATION where Toy Train of Darjeeling Himalayan Railways (DHR) listed as a world heritage by UNESCO stops enroute to Kurseong and Darjeeling.

Turn from there and drive through Goomtee Tea Estate, for another Four Kilometers to reach the hill marvel JUNGPANA TEA ESTATE. The whole drive takes you little over an hour. For many, the journey appears to be quite adventurous. The entire journey is full of pristine natural beauty with a unique serenity and tranquility.

Tea Factory & Production 
The Tea Estate has two distinct divisions. The Lower Garden spans from to 3,300 ft. above sea level and is known as JUNGPANA. The Upper Garden span from 3,300 to 6,500 ft. and is known as MAHALDIRAM, with a deep forest dividing both gardens. 

The Tea Factory is located at 3,300 ft. level in JUNGPANA division and bringing the tea leaves from the Upper Garden is a big challenge. The plucked leaves from the upper garden (Mahaldiram) are packed into gunny-sacks and slid down by ingenious method through a steel cable to the factory to be processed. Nearly 6 Kms and a three thousand feet drop in just six minutes. It is a feat and process worth watching.

The factory is totally renovated and is one of the updated and beautiful tea factory in India. It has still maintained the more than a century old 35 KVA Generator Horizontal Engine – Made by – Crossley Brothers, Manchester (UK) in the year 1898. It was used to supply electricity to the entire tea factory and the director’s Bungalow from 1899 to 1987. It’s still in working condition. The tea processing machines are also FROM England, manufactured by Britannia in 1899 and are still in operating condition.

JUNGPANA produces only about 60,000 kilograms of tea a year, quite limited, but consistently of excellent quality that is much sought after by its high profile clientele.

Trade & Economy 
Apart from being promoted by Britain’s royal family, Darjeeling tea from Jungpana is sold by Fortnum & Manson, U.K., Harrods of Knightsbridge, U.K. Mariage, France and Fauchon, France. Jungpana tea is one of the best sold brands. Nestle markets Jungpana under its special tea brand in France, Switzerland, Germany and Japan.

Development 
MAYFAIR group, as a socially responsible corporate house, is in the process of peripheral development in this area. It has always created adequate opportunities of employment for the local residents both direct and indirect, which boosts the local economy.

Achievements 
In 2013 the front page of Calcutta Telegraph Proclaimed “The New Champ’ takes Darjeeling Cup. In 2014 at the world’s tea championship held in the USA, JUNGPANA won the award as the top Darjeeling Tea. In 2020 JUNGPANA was declared as the area’s finest Tea. In 2022 JUNGPANA tea was sold at Rs. 21,000 per Kg. in the year 2022.

The Human Side 
Ms. Lassi Tamang was the first woman factory manager at Jungpana Tea Estate for a decade from 2010-20. Post takeover by the MAYFAIR Group, all the employees have been given their proper dues in a judicious and ethical manner.

The Story of Tea Tourism at MAYFAIR 
The Director’s Bungalow built  in 1910 was  adobe of the royal family of Nepal while visiting Jungpana Tea Estate.

Now christened as MAYFAIR MANOR, the  Bungalow has been completely renovated, preserving the colonial style, evoking a bygone era. There are 12 rooms with fire place, cosy interiors with well preserved heirloom furniture passed on by the royalty of Nepal.

The Manor has a spa, a heated swimming pool, a well stocked library, verdant outdoor spaces, TT and pool table, a game room for kids and picture perfect gazeboes where you can curl up with a book or watch the clouds roll over the mountains.

A mountain top heaven with breath taking view offers a spectaculars experience with its Tea gardens, Dense forests, Mountains, Valley and Seven mesmerising water falls. A all inclusive resort, where we love to wrap our guests in luxury and adorn them pampering – We believe in intuitive hospitality.

External links 
 
 Retrieved from "https://en.wikipedia.org/w/index.php?title=Jungpana_Tea_Estate&oldid=1122383811"

Tea estates in Darjeeling district